Pumasillo (possibly from Quechua puma cougar, puma, sillu claw, "puma claw") is a mountain in the Vilcabamba mountain range in the Andes of Peru, about 5,991 m (19,656 ft) high. Pumasillo or Sacsarayoc also refers to the whole massif. It includes the peaks Pumasillo, Sacsarayoc and Lasunayoc. It is located in the Cusco Region, La Convención Province. Its slopes are within the administrative boundaries of the Peruvian city of Santa Teresa.

Elevation 
Other data from available digital elevation models: SRTM 5976 metres and TanDEM-X 5849 metres. The height of the nearest key col is 4594 meters, leading to a topographic prominence of 1397 meters. Pumasillo is considered a Mountain Subrange according to the Dominance System  and its dominance is 23.32%. Its parent peak is Salcantay and the Topographic isolation is 30.9 kilometers.

First Ascent 
Pumasillo was first climbed by Mike Gravina and SimonClark (UK) in 07/26/1957.

References 

Mountains of Peru
Mountains of Cusco Region